Jesus Antonio Lopez Sanchez (born 17 December 1984) is a Venezuelan male weightlifter, competing in the 62 kg category and representing Venezuela at international competitions. He participated at the 2016 Summer Olympics in the men's 62 kg event. He competed at world championships, including at the 2015 World Weightlifting Championships.

Major results

References

1984 births
Living people
Venezuelan male weightlifters
Weightlifters at the 2016 Summer Olympics
Olympic weightlifters of Venezuela
Place of birth missing (living people)
Pan American Games medalists in weightlifting
Pan American Games bronze medalists for Venezuela
Weightlifters at the 2015 Pan American Games
South American Games silver medalists for Venezuela
South American Games medalists in weightlifting
Competitors at the 2010 South American Games
Medalists at the 2015 Pan American Games
21st-century Venezuelan people